The eleventh season of the American reality talent show The Voice premiered on September 19, 2016, on NBC. A 30-minute preview episode aired following NBC's broadcast of the closing ceremony of the 2016 Summer Olympics on August 21, 2016. Adam Levine and Blake Shelton both returned for their eleventh season as coaches. Alicia Keys and Miley Cyrus joined the panel replacing Pharrell Williams and Christina Aguilera making it the first season with two female coaches. Carson Daly returned as the show's host.

Sundance Head was named the winner of the season, marking Blake Shelton's fifth win as a coach.

Coaches and hosts

There were two changes to the coaching panel from season ten. Coaches Adam Levine and Blake Shelton are joined by Alicia Keys and Miley Cyrus, who respectively replaced Pharrell Williams and Christina Aguilera, thus making it the first season to have two female coaches. Carson Daly returned for his 11th season as host. This is Alicia Keys's second appearance on the show after being the advisor for Team Pharrell in the Battle rehearsals in season 7. This is also Miley Cyrus's second appearance on the show after being key advisor for the Knockout rehearsals in season 10, making her the youngest ever coach in any of the national versions of The Voice franchise worldwide at that time at the age of 24 (until Tini Stoessel coach La Voz... Argentina at the age of 21 in 2018).

The mentors for the Battle Rounds this season were: Sammy Hagar for Team Adam, Bette Midler for Team Blake, Charlie Puth for Team Alicia, and Joan Jett for Team Miley. Tim McGraw and Faith Hill served as key advisors for all four teams.

Teams
 Color key

Blind auditions
Color key

Episode 1 (Sept. 19)
The coaches performed "Dream On" at the start of the show, as a tribute to former contestant Christina Grimmie who was killed on June 10, 2016 (occurred after the finals of the previous season).

Episode 2 (Sept. 20)

Episode 3 (Sept. 26)

Episode 4 (Sept. 27)

Episode 5 (Oct. 3)

Episode 6 (Oct. 4)
This episode covered the Best of the Blind Auditions and a sneak peek of the next stage of competition, the Battle Rounds.

The Battles
The Battles round started with episode 7 and ended with episode 10 (broadcast on October 10, 11, 17, 18, 2016). Season eleven's advisors include: Sammy Hagar for Team Adam, Joan Jett for Team Miley, Charlie Puth for Team Alicia and Bette Midler for Team Blake. As like previous seasons, each coaches can steal two losing artists from another coach.

Color key:

The Knockouts
For the Knockouts, Tim McGraw and Faith Hill were assigned as partner husband-and-wife duo mentors for contestants in all four teams. Like previous Knockouts, each coaches can each steal one losing artist. The top 20 artists will then move on to the "Live Shows."

Color key:

Live shows
Color key:

Week 1: Live Playoffs (Nov. 7)
For the first time in The Voice history, playoff results were voted on in real-time, exclusively through Twitter and The Voice app. All 20 artists sang live and eight were eliminated by the end of the night. The Live Playoffs all aired in one episode due to coverage of the 2016 Presidential Election the next day.

Week 2: Top 12 (Nov. 14 & 15)
The Top 12 performed on Monday, November 14, 2016, with the results following on Tuesday, November 15, 2016. For the live shows this week, Garth Brooks was assigned as a mentor for final 12 contestants in all four teams. For this week, the bottom two artists compete for the Instant Save and one artist was eliminated. None of the artists reached the top 10 on iTunes, so no bonuses were awarded.

Week 3: Top 11 (Nov. 21 & 22)
The Top 11 performed on Monday, November 21, 2016, with the results following on Tuesday, November 22, 2016. iTunes bonus multiplier was awarded to Sundance Head (#9).

Week 4: Top 10 (Nov. 28 & 29)
The Top 10 performed on Monday, November 28, 2016, with the results following on Tuesday, November 29, 2016. This week featured a double elimination and a bottom three Instant Save. iTunes bonus multipliers were awarded to Head (#1), Brendan Fletcher (#2), Billy Gilman (#4), Christian Cuevas (#6) and Wé McDonald (#9). For the first time since the inclusion of the Instant Save in season five, a contestant was saved three consecutive weeks.

Week 5: Semifinals (Dec. 5 & 6)
The Top eight performed on Monday, December 5, 2016, with the results following on Tuesday, December 6, 2016. This week, the three artists with the most votes made it straight to the finals, the two artists with the fewest votes were immediately eliminated and the middle three contended for the remaining spot in the finals via Instant Save. In addition to their individual songs, each artist performed a duet with another artist in the competition, though these duets were not available for purchase on iTunes. iTunes bonus multipliers were awarded to Gilman (#1), Head (#2), Josh Gallagher (#3) and Cuevas (#4).

With the eliminations of Ali Caldwell and Aaron Gibson, Miley Cyrus no longer has any artists remaining on her team. With the advancement of McDonald to the finale, Alicia Keys becomes the second new coach to successfully get an artist on her team to the finale on her first attempt as a coach, the first being Usher, who coached Michelle Chamuel all the way to the finale of the fourth season.

Week 6: Finale (Dec. 12 & 13)
The Top four performed on Monday, December 12, 2016, with the final results following on Tuesday, December 13, 2016. Finalists performed a solo cover song, a duet with their coach, and an original song. iTunes bonus multipliers were awarded to Head (#1, #2 and #7), Gilman (#3 and #4), Gallagher (#6) and McDonald (#10). All iTunes votes received for the five weeks leading up to the finale were cumulatively added to online and app finale votes for each finalist.

Elimination chart

Overall
Color key
Artist's info

Result details

Team
Color key
Artist's info

Result details

Artists who appeared on other shows or seasons
 Darby Walker appeared as herself in nine episodes of the television sitcom "Girl Meets World".
 Sundance Head was on the sixth season of American Idol and was eliminated during Top 16 Week.
 Lauren Diaz appeared on the second season of America's Most Talented Kid.
 Nolan Neal auditioned for the tenth season of The Voice but did not score a chair turn. Later On, He later competed on 15th season of America's Got Talent, and was eliminated in the Quarter-Finals.
 Elia Esparza later on auditioned for the sixth season of La Voz México joining Team Laura Pausini, and also appeared on sixteenth season of American Idol and eliminated at the end of Hollywood Week.
 Preston James also auditioned on the sixteenth season of American Idol and got cut at Hollywood week.
 Jason Warrior later appeared on the first season of The Four: Battle For Stardom and was eliminated in Week 5 and made it to the Top 24 on the 19th season of American Idol.
 Ali Caldwell later appeared on the second season of The Four: Battle for Stardom and was eliminated in Week 7.
Chris Cron had major success with his band Mêlée with the song “Built To Last” in the late-2000s
 Kylie Rothfield would later appear on the second season of Songland.
 Natasha Bure is the daughter of the actress of Full House and Fuller House, Candace Cameron Bure
 Wé McDonald will appear on the twenty-first season of American Idol in 2023.

Ratings

References

External links

Season 11
2016 American television seasons